The Toorak Handicap is a Melbourne Racing Club Group 1 Thoroughbred horse race run as an open handicap race, over a distance of 1,600 metres at Caulfield Racecourse, Melbourne, Australia.  Currently, the prizemoney is A$1,000,000.

History
The race is held annually in October on Caulfield Guineas day, the first day of the MRC Spring Carnival.

During World War II the race was run at Flemington Racecourse.

The G1 1400 metre Sir Rupert Clarke Stakes, held three weeks earlier under the same handicap conditions at Caulfield is considered the predominant lead up race. Thoroughbreds which perform well usually follow up by entering the G1 Cantala Stakes on Victoria Derby day. Some of the classier thoroughbreds do extend in distance and are successful.

1922 racebook

Name
1886–1980 - Toorak Handicap
1981–1984 - The IXL
1985–1989 - The Elders Mile
1990 onwards - Toorak Handicap

Distance
 1886–1890 - 1 mile (~1600 metres)
 1891 - 1 miles (~1800 metres)
 1892–1971 - 1 mile (~1600 metres)
 1972 onwards - 1600 metres

Grade
1886–1978 - Principal Race
1979 onwards - Group 1

Double winners
Thoroughbreds that have won the Toorak Handicap – Caulfield Cup double:
The Trump (1937), Royal Gem (1946), Galilee (1966), Tobin Bronze (1967), Leilani (1974).

Winners

 2022 - Tuvalu  
 2021 - I'm Thunderstruck
 2020 - Mr Quickie
 2019 - Fierce Impact
 2018 - Land Of Plenty
 2017 - Tosen Stardom
 2016 – He's Our Rokkii
 2015 – Lucky Hussler
 2014 – Trust In A Gust
 2013 – Solzhenitsyn
 2012 – Solzhenitsyn
 2011 – King Mufhasa
 2010 – More Joyous
 2009 – Allez Wonder
 2008 – Alamosa
 2007 – Divine Madonna
 2006 – Red Dazzler
 2005 – Barely A Moment
 2004 – Regal Roller
 2003 – Roman Arch
 2002 – Shot Of Thunder
 2001 – Show A Heart
 2000 – Umrum
 1999 – Umrum
 1998 – Marble Halls
 1997 – Penghulu
 1996 – Poetic King
 1995 – Sober Suit
 1994 – Oppressor
 1993 – Golden Sword
 1992 – Ready To Explode
 1991 – Comrade
 1990 – Ricochet Rosie
 1989 – Cole Diesel
 1988 – Planet Ruler
 1987 – Caledonian Boy
 1986 – Canny Lass
 1985 – King Phoenix
 1984 – Mr. Ironclad
 1983 – Showmeran
 1982 – Magari
 1981 – Penny Edition
 1980 – Torbek
 1979 – Manaroa
 1978 – Salamander
 1977 – Nunkalowe
 1976 – Visit
 1975 – Plush
 1974 – Leilani
 1973 – Princess Eulogy
 1972 – All Shot
 1971 – Gunsynd
 1970 – Tauto
 1969 – Crewman 
 1968 – Tried And True
 1967 – Tobin Bronze
 1966 – Galilee
 1965 – Ripa
 1964 – Nicopolis
 1963 – Nicopolis
 1962 – Gay Filou
 1961 – Anonyme
 1960 – Gabonia
 1959 – Smokey Jane
 1958 – Tudor Hill
 1957 – Mac's Amber
 1956 – Farquhar
 1955 – Harmonist
 1954 – Plato
 1953 – Desert Breeze
 1952 – Desert Breeze
 1951 – Jovial Lad
 1950 – Grey Boots
 1949 – Saxony
 1948 – Saxony
 1947 – Don Pedro
 1946 – Royal Gem
 1945 – Huntingdale
 1944 – The Bohemian
 1943 – ‡ Burberry / Counsel 
 1942 – Crojick
 1941 – Sun Valley
 1940 – Gold Salute
 1939 – Hilton
 1938 – † El Golea / Ena 
 1937 – The Trump
 1936 – The Chanter
 1935 – † Epigram / Journal
 1934 – Sir Simper
 1933 – Chilperic
 1932 – K. Cid
 1931 – Glenanton
 1930 – The Gay Mutineer
 1929 – Highland
 1928 – Kalloni
 1927 – Textile
 1926 – Abdera
 1925 – Metellus  
 1924 – Soorak
 1923 – Sonora
 1922 – The Tyrant
 1921 – Stare
 1920 – Lord Setay
 1919 – St. Mira
 1918 – Prince Royal
 1917 – King's Bounty
 1916 – Rael Locin
 1915 – Miss Meadows
 1914 – Rathlea
 1913 – Valido
 1912 – Uncle Sam
 1911 – Motoa
 1910 – Sequarious
 1909 – Irishman
 1908 – Soultline
 1907 – True Scot
 1906 – Iolaire
 1905 – Dandalla
 1904 – Ossian
 1903 – F.J.A.
 1902 – Kinglock
 1901 – Bonnie Chiel
 1900 – Lochaber
 1899 – Alva
 1898 – Massinissa
 1897 – Paul Pry
 1896 – Hopscotch
 1895 – Mostyn
 1894 – Devon
 1893 – Titan
 1892 – Fortunatus
 1891 – Zalinski
 1890 – Precedence
 1889 – Maelstrom
 1888 – Bothwell
 1887 – Dufferin
 1886 – Middlemarch
 1885 – Mentmore
 1884 – Precious Stone
 1883 – Bar One
 1882 – Verdure
 1881 – Josephine

† Dead heat
‡ Run in divisions

See also
 List of Australian Group races
 Group races

References

Open mile category horse races
Group 1 stakes races in Australia
Caulfield Racecourse